Birmingham Phoenix are a franchise 100-ball cricket side based in the city of Birmingham. The team represents the historic counties of Warwickshire and Worcestershire in the newly founded The Hundred competition, which began its inaugural season on 21 July 2021, during the English and Welsh cricket season. Both the men's and women's sides play at Edgbaston.

History 

The announcement of the new eight-team men's and women's tournament series in 2019 was not without controversy, with the likes of Virat Kohli criticising the England and Wales Cricket Board for pursuing a shift away from Test cricket, while others argued the format should have followed the established and successful Twenty20 format. The ECB however decided it needed a more unique format to draw crowds.

In July 2019 the side announced that former Australian batsman Andrew McDonald would be the men's team's first coach. McDonald will be assisted by Daniel Vettori, Jim Troughton and Alex Gidman. In September Ben Sawyer was appointed the first coach of the women's side.

The inaugural Hundred draft took place in October 2019 and saw the Phoenix claim Chris Woakes as their headline men's draftee, and Amy Jones as the women's headliner. They are joined by England international Moeen Ali and Worcestershire's Pat Brown for the men's team, while Kirstie Gordon joins Jones in the women's side.

Honours

Men's honours 

The Hundred

 Runners-up: 2021

Women's honours 

The Hundred

 Third place: 2021

Ground 

Both the Birmingham Phoenix men's side and women's sides play at the home of Warwickshire County Cricket Club, Edgbaston Cricket Ground, in the Edgbaston area of Birmingham. The women's side had been due to play at the home of Worcestershire County Cricket Club, New Road, Worcester but both teams were brought together at the same ground as a result of the COVID-19 pandemic.

Players

Current squad

Men's side 
 Bold denotes players with international caps.
  denotes a player who is unavailable for rest of the season.

Men's captains
 Italics denote a temporary captain when the main captain was unavailable.

Women's side 
 Bold denotes players with international caps.
  denotes a player who is unavailable for rest of the season.

Women's captains
 Italics denote a temporary captain when the main captain was unavailable.

Seasons

Group stages

Knockout rounds

See also 

 List of Birmingham Phoenix cricketers
 List of cricket grounds in England and Wales
 List of Test cricket grounds

References

Further reading 

 BBC: The Hundred player draft – covering the first draft signings for each region's team

External links 

 Official web page

Warwickshire County Cricket Club
Worcestershire County Cricket Club
Cricket in Warwickshire
Cricket in Worcestershire
Sport in Warwickshire
Sport in Worcester, England
The Hundred (cricket) teams
2019 establishments in England
Birmingham Phoenix